Sergeant Borck is a 1955 West German drama film directed by Gerhard Lamprecht and starring Gerhard Riedmann, Annemarie Düringer and Ingrid Andree. It is a remake of the 1935 film Sergeant Schwenke. It was shot at the Spandau Studios in West Berlin and on location in Hamburg. The film's sets were designed by the art directors Willi A. Herrmann and Heinrich Weidemann.

Cast

References

Bibliography 
 Goble, Alan. The Complete Index to Literary Sources in Film. Walter de Gruyter, 1999.

External links 
 

1955 films
1955 crime drama films
German crime drama films
West German films
1950s German-language films
Films directed by Gerhard Lamprecht
Police detective films
Remakes of German films
German black-and-white films
1950s German films
Films shot at Spandau Studios
Films shot in Hamburg